Homer Township is located in Will County, Illinois. As of the 2010 census, its population was 39,059 and it contained 13,418 housing units. In 2001, the village of Homer Glen was incorporated within area that is Homer Township.  This region was formerly an unincorporated census-designated place known as Goodings Grove, Illinois.

Geography

Cities, towns villages
Homer Glen (vast majority)
Lemont (small portion)
Lockport (small portion)

Other Communities
Hadley at 
Lockport Heights

Ghost Towns
Goodings Grove

Demographics

Education
Homer Township and Homer Glen is part of the Homer Community Consolidated School District 33C, with some areas part of Will County School District 92.

References

External links
City-data.com
Will County Official Site
Illinois State Archives
https://web.archive.org/web/20140306123949/http://www.homerglenil.org/environment/IntlDarkSky.aspx

Townships in Will County, Illinois
Townships in Illinois
1836 establishments in Illinois